The pot-de-fer was a primitive cannon made of iron. It was used by the French in the Hundred Years' War. The name means "iron pot" in French. In Italy, pots-de-fer were known as vasi or vasii, meaning "pot" or "vase".

Description

Though occasionally made with cast bronze, the pot-de-fer was essentially an iron  bottle with a narrow neck. It was loaded with powder and an iron arrow-like bolt, feathered with iron. It is believed that the middle of the bolt was likely wrapped in leather for a snug fit, necessary to enhance the thrust from the gaseous pressure within the cannon. However, this feature is not shown in manuscript illuminations. The cannon was set off through a small-diameter touchhole, where a red-hot wire could be thrust to set off an explosion and fire the cannon.

Historical uses and mentions
The pot-de-fer was first depicted in a manuscript, De officiis regum of 1326, by Walter de Millimete, an illuminated  manuscript of 1327 that was presented to Edward III upon his accession to the English throne. The manuscript shows a large vase lying on a table, with an armored man behind it holding a rudimentary linstock near the bottom (in this case the linstock would have held a red-hot wire, heated in a brazier, rather than a slow match). A bolt, called a garrot, protrudes from the muzzle. Although illustrated in the treatise, no explanation or description was given.

The pot-de-fer was used by the French in the Hundred Years' War in a raid on Southampton and in battles in Périgord, Cambrai, and Quesnoy. They may also have been used against the Scottish by the English.

An early reference to the name in French is as pot de fer a traire garros (an iron jug for throwing arrows). Such a 'pot de fer' had a bottle shape, which may have suggested its name.

Scholarly interest and research

The unusual vase-like shape of the cannon, coupled with the depicted arrow projectile, caused many modern historians to doubt the efficiency — or even existence — of the weapon. In order to establish these points, researchers at the Royal Armouries reconstructed and trialled the weapon in 1999.  The walls of the chamber were very thick to prevent explosion, leaving a cylindrical bore which was loaded by a wooden arrow with bronze flights (also reconstructed based on archeological findings), of 135 cm length.  Estimating the size of the cannon from the illustrated man standing beside it, the reconstructed cannon was 90 cm long, and 40 cm at its widest point; cast in bronze the reconstruction weighed 410 kg.  The subsequent trials showed that the gun was not powerful, firing the arrow only 180 m at most; a larger charge of powder resulted only in the destruction of the arrow.

See also
Battle of Crécy
Bombard
Gunpowder

References

Cannon
Medieval artillery
Artillery of France